End of Amnesia is the second studio album by M. Ward. Originally released by Future Farmer Records, it has been reissued on M. Ward Records.

Track listing

References

2001 albums
M. Ward albums